Raymond is a city in Pacific County, Washington, United States. The population was 2,882 at the 2010 census. The 2020 census showed the population of 3,081, an increase of 6.4%. The town's economy has traditionally been based on logging and fishing, together with a limited amount of tourism.

History
Raymond was incorporated on August 6, 1907. Raymond was named after L.V. Raymond, who was the first postmaster in Raymond.  In the early years, Raymond's business section was built on stilts five or six feet above the tidelands and sloughs that crisscrossed the site. Elevated sidewalks and streets connected most of the buildings. Raymond claimed a population of 6,000 in the year 1913 and had a reputation as a wild and wooly lumber mill town. City fathers resisted the unwanted reputation with promotions of Raymond as "The Empire City of Willapa Harbor" and "The City That Does Things". Lyricist Robert Wells, who wrote "The Christmas Song" with Mel Tormé, was born in Raymond in 1922.
Raymond was the city where the grunge band Nirvana played their first gig, on March 7, 1987.

Raymond saw an influx of cannabis manufacturing and agricultural jobs after the passing of Initiative 502 in November 2012, which legalized the recreational use of marijuana.  Raymond has embraced all aspects of this lucrative industry by welcoming many new start-up businesses including commercial marijuana grow operations, marijuana-infused goods manufacturing, as well as retail marijuana stores.

Geography

Raymond is located at  (46.679599, -123.738091).

Climate
According to the Köppen Climate Classification system, Raymond has a warm-summer Mediterranean climate, abbreviated "Csb" on climate maps.

On June 27th 2021, Raymond reached a maximum recorded temperature of 103 degrees Fahrenheit.

Demographics

2010 census
At the 2010 census there were 2,882 people, 1,151 households, and 698 families living in the city. The racial makeup of the city was 75.9% White, 0.9% African American, 2.5% Native American, 6.8% Asian, 10.1% from other races, and 3.9% from two or more races. Hispanic or Latino of any race were 16.2%.

Of the 1,151 households 29.4% had children under the age of 18 living with them, 42.9% were married couples living together, 10.4% had a female householder with no husband present, 7.3% had a male householder with no wife present, and 39.4% were non-families. 33.4% of households were one person and 15.2% were one person aged 65 or older. The average household size was 2.46 and the average family size was 3.10.

The median age was 41 years. 23.4% of residents were under the age of 18; 8.6% were between the ages of 18 and 24; 22.2% were from 25 to 44; 27.5% were from 45 to 64; and 18.4% were 65 or older. The gender makeup of the city was 49.9% male and 50.1% female.

2000 census
At the 2000 census there were 2,975 people, 1,192 households, and 760 families living in the city.  The population density was 776.4 people per square mile (299.9/km).  There were 1,338 housing units at an average density of 349.2 per square mile (134.9/km).  The racial makeup of the city was 83.70% White, 0.24% African American, 2.72% Native American, 7.06% Asian, 0.17% Pacific Islander, 3.16% from other races, and 2.96% from two or more races. Hispanic or Latino of any race were 9.18%. 12.0% were of English, 11.6% German, 7.6% Irish, 6.0% American and 5.7% Polish ancestry according to Census 2000.

Of the 1,192 households 30.0% had children under the age of 18 living with them, 45.9% were married couples living together, 11.3% had a female householder with no husband present, and 36.2% were non-families. 30.8% of households were one person and 16.5% were one person aged 65 or older.  The average household size was 2.44 and the average family size was 3.00.

The age distribution was 26.2% under the age of 18, 7.9% from 18 to 24, 23.5% from 25 to 44, 22.9% from 45 to 64, and 19.6% 65 or older.  The median age was 40 years. For every 100 females, there were 96.0 males.  For every 100 females age 18 and over, there were 94.0 males.

The median household income was $25,759 and the median family income  was $33,984. Males had a median income of $29,402 versus $24,647 for females. The per capita income for the city was $13,910.  About 17.2% of families and 24.6% of the population were below the poverty line, including 28.4% of those under age 18 and 20.7% of those age 65 or over.

See also
 Willapa Bay
 Steamboats of Willapa Bay
 Raymond Theater

Sources
 Pacific County Historical Society

References

External links
 History of Raymond at HistoryLink

Cities in Pacific County, Washington
Cities in Washington (state)
1907 establishments in Washington (state)